Mid Down was a UK parliamentary constituency in Ireland. It returned one Member of Parliament (MP) to the British House of Commons from  1918 to 1922, using the first past the post electoral system .

Boundaries and Boundary Changes
1918-1922: The Urban District of Holywood, the Rural Districts of Castlereagh and Hillsborough, and the District Electoral Divisions of Ballygowan, Ballymaglaff, Kilmood, Moneyreagh and Tullynakill in the Rural District of Newtownards.

This county constituency comprised the central northern part of County Down, to the south-east of the city of Belfast.

Prior to the 1918 General Election parts of the area were included in East Down, West Down and North Down constituencies. After the dissolution of Parliament in 1922 Mid Down became part of the two-member Down constituency.

Politics
The constituency was a strongly unionist area, as demonstrated by the small Sinn Féin vote in 1918.

The MP elected in 1918, Sir James Craig, became the Ulster Unionist leader and the first Prime Minister of Northern Ireland in 1921. Having accepted his new office from the Crown on 7 June 1921, Craig's Westminster seat was automatically vacated. He did not seek re-election and a new Unionist MP was elected unopposed.

Dáil Éireann
Sinn Féin contested the general election of 1918 on the platform that instead of taking up any seats they won in the United Kingdom Parliament, they would establish a revolutionary assembly in Dublin. In republican theory every MP elected in Ireland was a potential Deputy to this assembly. In practice only the Sinn Féin members accepted the offer.

The revolutionary First Dáil assembled on 21 January 1919 and last met on 10 May 1921. The First Dáil, according to a resolution passed on 10 May 1921, was formally dissolved on the assembling of the Second Dáil. This took place on 16 August 1921.

In 1921 Sinn Féin decided to use the UK authorised elections for the Northern Ireland House of Commons and the House of Commons of Southern Ireland as a poll for the Irish Republic's Second Dáil. Mid Down, in republican theory, was incorporated in an eight-member Dáil constituency of Down.

Members of Parliament 1918–1922

Elections

Appointment of Craig as Prime Minister of Northern Ireland

References

External links
 https://www.oireachtas.ie/en/members/
 https://web.archive.org/web/20060423011521/http://historical-debates.oireachtas.ie/en.toc.dail.html

See also
 List of UK Parliament Constituencies in Ireland and Northern Ireland
 Redistribution of Seats (Ireland) Act 1918
 List of MPs elected in the 1918 United Kingdom general election
 List of Dáil Éireann constituencies in Ireland (historic)
 Members of the 1st Dáil

Westminster constituencies in County Down (historic)
Dáil constituencies in Northern Ireland (historic)
Constituencies of the Parliament of the United Kingdom established in 1918
Constituencies of the Parliament of the United Kingdom disestablished in 1922